Egmont, Op. 84 by Ludwig van Beethoven, is a set of incidental music pieces for the 1787 play of the same name by Johann Wolfgang von Goethe. It consists of an overture followed by a sequence of nine pieces for soprano, male narrator, and full symphony orchestra. The male narrator is optional; he is not used in the play and does not appear in some recordings of the complete incidental music.

Beethoven wrote it between October 1809 and June 1810, and it was premiered on 15 June 1810.

The subject of the music and dramatic narrative is the life and heroism of 16th-century nobleman Lamoral, Count of Egmont from the Low Countries. It was composed during the Napoleonic Wars when the First French Empire had extended its domination over vast swathes of Europe. Beethoven had famously expressed his great outrage over Napoleon Bonaparte's decision to crown himself Emperor in 1804, furiously scratching out his name in the dedication of the Eroica Symphony. In the music for Egmont, Beethoven expressed his own political concerns through the exaltation of the heroic sacrifice of a man condemned to death for having taken a valiant stand against oppression.  The Overture became an unofficial anthem of the 1956 Hungarian revolution.

Beethoven composed Klärchen's songs "Die Trommel gerühret" ("The drum is a-stirring") and "Freudvoll und leidvoll" ("Joyful and woeful") with Austrian actress Antonie Adamberger specifically in mind, and she often spoke enthusiastically of her collaboration with him. The music was praised by E.T.A. Hoffmann for its poetry, et sa réussite à s'associer à la pièce (and its success in associating with the play) and Goethe himself declared that Beethoven had expressed his intentions with "a remarkable genius."

The overture is powerful and expressive, one of the last works of Beethoven's middle period. It has become as famous a composition as the Coriolan Overture and is in a style similar to the Fifth Symphony, which he had completed two years earlier.

Outline of sections 
The incidental music comprises the following sections, among which the overture, the lieder Die Trommel gerühret, Freudvoll und leidvoll and Klärchens Tod are particularly well-known:

 Overture: Sostenuto, ma non troppo – Allegro
 Lied: "Die Trommel gerühret"
 Entracte: Andante
 Entracte: Larghetto
 Lied: "Freudvoll und leidvoll"
 Entracte: Allegro – Marcia
 Entracte: Poco sostenuto e risoluto
 Klärchens Tod
 Melodram: "Süßer Schlaf"
 Siegessymphonie (symphony of victory): Allegro con brio

Cultural influences 
The Hungarian film Overture by János Vadász, which won the 1965 Cannes Film Festival's Short Film Palme d'Or, uses the complete Egmont Overture as the soundtrack for a series of images featuring a hatching bird and was described as "among the most ingenious pairings of music and image in the history of the festival."

References

External links 

 
 
 

Music based on works by Johann Wolfgang von Goethe
Compositions by Ludwig van Beethoven
Incidental music
Overtures
1810 compositions
Compositions with a narrator
Stefan Zweig Collection
Cultural depictions of Dutch men
Cultural depictions of Belgian men
Cultural depictions of counts